Herbert Franz Josef Huber (1 January 1931 – 1 October 2005) was a German botanist. At the time of his death in 2005 he was professor emeritus at the University of Kaiserslautern, Germany. He is known for his contributions to the classification of angiosperms.

Life 
He was the son of biology professor at the Theological-Philosophical College at Dillingen, where he grew up. He studied under Hermann Merxmüller in Munich and completed a thesis there on Ceropegia in 1958. After graduating he took up a position as curator at the Botanic Garden at the University of Würzburg, and from there he became professor of botany at the University of Mérida, Venezuela. On returning to Germany he became chair of the Hamburg Herbarium, before taking up the position at Kaiserslautern where he remained till retirement.

Work 
Huber was one of the first scientists to challenge the traditional division of angiosperms into monocotyledons and dicotyledons, on morphological grounds. He was also amongst the first taxonomists to suggest that the vast Liliaceae family be broken up into smaller family units. His contributions did not meet a wide audience outside of his own country since he mainly wrote in German, and publishing in the Mitteilungen der Botanischen Staatssammlung München.

It was at Munich that his most influential paper Die Samenmerkmale und Verwandtschaftsverhältnisse der Liliiflorae (1969) was written, a detailed study of the seeds of Liliiflorae and in particular the Liliaceae, in which he proposed splitting the family into two, the 'Asparagoid' Liliiflorae and the 'Colchicoid' Lilliiflorae. Huber's narrower conception of families, was an important stepping stone towards the eventual family structure produced by the Angiosperm Phylogeny Group. When Dahlgren and Clifford published  their study of families of monocotyledons (1985) they developed and popularised Huber's concept, giving rise to the formation of a new order, the Asparagales. Other important work deals with the Rosiflorae (sensu Dahlgren), the classification of dicotyledons and seed anatomy.

Legacy 
The genus Hubera was named after him.

Selected publications 
 Huber, H. (1955) Ceropegia humbertii  Mitt. Bot. Staatssamml. Munchen, Heft 12: 72. 
 Huber, H. (1985) Annonaceae, pp. 1–75. In: Dassanayake, M.D. & Fosberg, F.R. (eds.), A revised handbook to the flora of Ceylon, 5. Amerind Publishing Co., New Delhi, 476 pp

References

Bibliography 

 
 
 
 

20th-century German botanists
German taxonomists
1931 births
2005 deaths